Khard Mard or Kherad Mard may refer to:
 Khard Mard-e Anisi
 Khard Mard-e Rezai